The swift parrot (Lathamus discolor) is a species of broad-tailed parrot, found only in southeastern Australia. The species breeds in Tasmania during the summer and migrates north to south eastern mainland Australia from Griffith-Warialda in New South Wales and west to Adelaide in the winter. It is a nomadic migrant, and it settles in an area only when there is food available. 

The species is critically endangered, and the severe predation of introduced sugar gliders (Petaurus breviceps) on breeding females and nests in some locations has demonstrated an unexpected but potentially serious new threat. Sugar glider predation is worst where logging is severe; these threats interact in a synergistic manner. Genetic evidence for the effective population size suggests that the minimum potential population size is now fewer than 300 individual swift parrots. The genetic evidence supports the results of earlier studies that use demographic information about swift parrots to show the species could be extinct by 2031.

Habitat for the critically endangered swift parrot is being “knowingly destroyed” by logging because of government failures to manage the species’ survival. Matthew Webb and Dejan Stojanovic, two of the Eureka prize finalists from the Australian National University’s Difficult Bird Research Group, say governments have stalled on management plans that would protect known feeding and nesting habitat in Tasmania. The researchers analysed logging in Tasmania’s southern forests during the 20-year course of the previous regional forest agreement. They found that a third of the eucalypt forest in this area had been logged between 1997 and 2016 and a quarter of old growth trees that provide nesting habitat for swift parrots had been cleared. “It is very clear that critical breeding habitat is being logged and that current logging regimes are not sustainable,” the paper states.

Taxonomy
The surgeon John White described the swift parrot in 1790 as the red-shouldered paroquet (Psittacus discolor). It was placed in the genus Lathamus by René Primevère Lesson in 1830.

A 2011 genetic study including nuclear and mitochondrial DNA found that the swift parrot was an early offshoot from a lineage giving rise to the genera Prosopeia, Eunymphicus and Cyanoramphus, diverging around 14 million years ago.

"Swift parrot" has been designated the official common name by the International Ornithologists' Union (IOC).

Description
It is mainly green with bluish crown and red on the face above and below the beak. The adult female is slightly duller, and the juvenile has a dark brown iris and a pale orange bill. The forehead to throat is crimson and there is also crimson patch at the top, edge of the wing. They are noisy, always active and showy, and are very fast with their direct flight.

Breeding
The species breeds in Tasmania from September to February. It nests in tree cavities, but is highly selective in the types of cavities it uses as nests. It prefers cavities with small entrances, deep chambers and wide floors. Tree cavities with these traits are rare and comprise only 5% of the available cavities in Tasmanian forests. These cavities are more likely to occur in large trees. These characteristics of tree cavities are important for passive defense of their nests against native Tasmanian predators. Tree cavities suitable for nesting are highly vulnerable to disturbance. Wildfire caused the collapse of 62.8% of known swift parrot nest cavities (and 48.6% of nesting trees). Deforestation (primarily driven by native forest logging) has been an important contemporary cause of habitat loss for swift parrots. In just one area of swift parrot breeding habitat, the southern forests, 33% of total forest cover was lost/disturbed by logging between 1996–2016, and 23% of potential swift parrot nesting habitat was logged over this same time period. The local extent of deforestation is also positively correlated with other threats to the parrots like predation by sugar gliders.

Swift parrots select where to breed in Tasmania based on the local availability of both food and nesting sites. The parrots settle wherever in Tasmania their preferred food (nectar from flowering Eucalyptus globulus and Eucalyptus ovata) is abundant, but birds can only breed where suitable nesting sites are also available nearby. Because swift parrots prefer to breed in the most resource rich patch of food, they are able to rear their nestlings in the 'best' conditions each year. Successful swift parrot nests have a mean clutch sizes of 3.8 eggs, and produce 3.2 fledglings, equating to breeding success of 86.9%. However sugar gliders, which are introduced to Tasmania, are a major nest predator of swift parrots. Sugar gliders can result in locally severe parrot nesting failure, and there is a positive relationship between the severity of glider predation and land-cover of mature forest within 500m of a swift parrot nest. This relationship means that in locations where forest cover is low and disturbed, nest failure of swift parrots can be as high as 100%. Sugar gliders are tolerant of forest disturbance, and have high rates of occupancy of swift parrot habitat in Tasmania. On offshore islands where sugar gliders are absent, swift parrots have higher breeding success.

Distribution
Genetic evidence has shown that the swift parrot is a single, genetically mixed and nomadic population that moves around the landscape each year. Because they are nomadic, swift parrots can occur across a very large potential area, but settlement at a given location depends on the local availability of food. However, in the Tasmanian breeding range, swift parrots need both food and suitable nesting sites to occur in close proximity in order to nest at a given site. The swift parrot migrates each year across Bass Strait between Tasmania and the mainland of Australia. They arrive in Tasmania during September and return to south-eastern Australia during March and April. They can be found as far north as south-eastern Queensland and as far west as Adelaide in South Australia, although recent sightings have been restricted to the south-eastern part of the state. Because swift parrots are nomadic migrants, their occurrence at any one location are difficult to predict. Although they will repeatedly return to the same locations, local occurrence may only happen intermittently depending on whether or not food (flowering trees) is available in a given year.

Important Bird Areas

BirdLife International has identified the following sites as being important for swift parrots:

 New South Wales
 Brisbane Water
 Capertee Valley
 Hastings-Macleay
 Hunter Valley
 Lake Macquarie
 Richmond Woodlands
 South-west Slopes of NSW
 Tuggerah
 Ulladulla to Merimbula

 Victoria
 Bendigo Box-Ironbark Region
 Maryborough-Dunolly Box-Ironbark Region
 Puckapunyal
 Rushworth Box-Ironbark Region
 St Arnaud Box-Ironbark Region
 Warby-Chiltern Box-Ironbark Region

 Tasmania
 Bruny Island
 Maria Island
 South-east Tasmania

Habitat

Usually inhabiting: forests, woodlands, agricultural land and plantations, and also in urban areas.

Diet
Swift parrots are primarily nectar feeders, preferring nectar from flowering Eucalyptus spp. In Tasmania, their settlement of breeding habitat is regulated by the occurrence of flowering in their two main food trees Eucalyptus globulus and Eucalyptus ovata. In the winter, their habitat use is broader, with foraging occurring on a range of flowering Eucalyptus spp. across southeastern mainland Australia.

Conservation status
Modelling of demographic data predicted that the swift parrot is Critically Endangered. Further modelling showed that other aspects of their life history (sex ratio bias and shared paternity) makes their population declines worse than originally predicted. Genetic evidence showed there is only one swift parrot population, so threats at different times and places can potentially act on the entire population. Although expert opinion has estimated the species population size as approximately 2,000 individuals, recent genetic evidence suggests this is overly optimistic, and that the (minimum) census size of the population may be lower than 300 individuals. Severe deforestation of their breeding range has been long recognised as the principal threat to the species. Logging has already had severe impacts on habitat availability in recent decades and there is evidence that up to 23% of swift parrot breeding habitat has been logged just in the Southern Forests region of Tasmania over the last 20 years. Deforestation also affects the rate of predation by sugar gliders – where mature forest cover is diminished, parrots suffer worse predation rates.

Given the severity of deforestation across the breeding range, and the relationship between deforestation and sugar glider predation intensity, habitat loss in critical breeding areas of Tasmania may be the species most severe threat. Unfortunately, there is evidence that weak and ineffective policy for protection of threatened species in Tasmania's logged forests is likely to continue to threaten the swift parrot into the future.

Australia 
Swift parrots are listed as Endangered on the Australian Environment Protection and Biodiversity Conservation Act 1999 (EPBC Act), which has been criticised for failing to protect them and other threatened species.

Victoria 
The swift parrot is listed as threatened on the Victorian Flora and Fauna Guarantee Act (1988). Under this Act, an Action Statement for the recovery and future management of this species has been prepared.
 On the 2007 advisory list of threatened vertebrate fauna in Victoria, the swift parrot was listed as Endangered.

References

Further reading

Recent research findings 
The swift parrot has been studied since 2009 by the Difficult Bird Research Group at the Fenner School of Environment and Society of The Australian National University. Below are their research findings:

 Webb MH, Holdsworth MC, Webb J (2012) "Nesting requirements of the endangered swift parrot (Lathamus discolor)". Emu 112:181–188.
 Stojanovic D, Webb MH, Roshier D, Saunders D, Heinsohn R (2012). "Ground-based survey methods both overestimate and underestimate the abundance of suitable tree-cavities for the endangered swift parrot". Emu - Austral Ornithology 112:350–356.
 Stojanovic D, Koch AJ, Webb M, Cunningham RB, Roshier D, Heinsohn R (2014). "Validation of a landscape-scale planning tool for cavity dependent wildlife". Austral Ecology 39:579–586.
 Stojanovic D, Webb MH, Alderman R, Porfirio LL, Heinsohn R, Beard K (2014). "Discovery of a novel predator reveals extreme but highly variable mortality for an endangered migratory bird". Diversity and Distributions 20:1200–1207.
 Saunders DL and Heinsohn R (2008). "Winter habitat use by the endangered, migratory swift parrot (Lathamus discolor) in New South Wales". Emu - Austral Ornithology 108:81–89.
 Webb MH, Wotherspoon S, Stojanovic D, Heinsohn R, Cunningham R, Bell P, Terauds A (2014). "Location matters: Using spatially explicit occupancy models to predict the distribution of the highly mobile, endangered swift parrot". Biological Conservation 176:99–108.
 Heinsohn R, Webb M, Lacy R, Terauds A, Alderman R, Stojanovic D (2015). "A severe predator-induced population decline predicted for endangered, migratory swift parrots (Lathamus discolor)". Biological Conservation 186:75–82.
 Stojanovic D, Terauds A, Westgate MJ, Webb MH, Roshier D, Heinsohn R (2015). Exploiting the richest patch has a fitness payoff for the migratory swift parrot". Journal of Animal Ecology 84:1194–1201.
 Stojanovic D, Webb Nee Voogdt J, Webb M, Cook H, Heinsohn R (2016). "Loss of habitat for a secondary cavity nesting bird after wildfire". Forest Ecology and Management 360:235–241.
 Saunders DL, Cunningham R, Wood J, Heinsohn R (2016). "Responses of Critically Endangered migratory Swift Parrots to variable winter drought". Emu - Austral Ornithology 116:350–359.
 Crates R, Rayner L, Stojanovic D, Webb M, Heinsohn R (2017). "Undetected Allee effects in Australia’s threatened birds: implications for conservation". Emu - Austral Ornithology 117:207–221.
 Stojanovic D, Rayner L, Webb M, Heinsohn R (2017). "Effect of nest cavity morphology on reproductive success of a critically endangered bird". Emu - Austral Ornithology 117:247–253.
 Webb MH, Terauds A, Tulloch A, Bell P, Stojanovic D, Heinsohn R (2017). "The importance of incorporating functional habitats into conservation planning for highly mobile species in dynamic systems". Conservation Biology 31:1018–1028.
 Allen M, Webb Matthew H, Alves F, Heinsohn R, Stojanovic D (2018). "Occupancy patterns of the introduced, predatory sugar glider in Tasmanian forests". Austral Ecology 43:470–475.
 Campbell CD, Sarre SD, Stojanovic D, Gruber B, Medlock K, Harris S, Macdonald AJ, Holleley CE (2018). "When is a native species invasive? Incursion of a novel predatory marsupial detected using molecular and historical data". Diversity and Distributions 24:831–840.
 Stojanovic D, Eyles S, Cook H, Alves F, Webb M, Heinsohn R (2018). "Photosensitive automated doors to exclude small nocturnal predators from nest boxes". Animal Conservation 22:297–301.
 Stojanovic D, Olah G, Webb M, Peakall R, Heinsohn R (2018). "Genetic evidence confirms severe extinction risk for critically endangered swift parrots: implications for conservation management". Animal Conservation 21:313–323.
 Heinsohn R, Olah G, Webb M, Peakall R, Stojanovic D (2019). "Sex ratio bias and shared paternity reduce individual fitness and population viability in a critically endangered parrot". Journal of Animal Ecology 88:502–510.
 Stojanovic D, Cook HCL, Sato C, Alves F, Harris G, Mckernan A, Rayner L, Webb MH, Sutherland WJ, Heinsohn R (2019). "Pre-emptive action as a measure for conserving nomadic species". The Journal of Wildlife Management 83:64–71.
 Webb MH, Heinsohn R, Sutherland WJ, Stojanovic D, Terauds A (2019). "An Empirical and Mechanistic Explanation of Abundance-Occupancy Relationships for a Critically Endangered Nomadic Migrant". The American Naturalist 193:59–69.
 Webb MH, Stojanovic D, Heinsohn R (2019). "Policy failure and conservation paralysis for the critically endangered swift parrot". Pacific Conservation Biology 25:116–123.
 Owens G, Heinsohn R, Eyles S, Stojanovic D (2020). "Automated broadcast of a predator call did not reduce predation pressure by Sugar Gliders on birds". Ecological Management & Restoration 21(3), 247–249.
 Olah G, Stojanovic D, Webb MH, Waples RS, Heinsohn R (2021). "Comparison of three techniques for genetic estimation of effective population size in a critically endangered parrot". Animal Conservation 24:491–498.

External links 
 
 

swift parrot
swift parrot
Birds of Tasmania
Endemic birds of Australia
Endangered fauna of Australia
Nature Conservation Act endangered biota
swift parrot
Articles containing video clips